Unquillo is a city in the province of Córdoba, Argentina. It is located about 28 km north-northwest from the center of the provincial capital, Córdoba City, and 14 km east of Cosquín.

Unquillo is the birthplace of professional tennis player David Nalbandian.

References

 
 http://www.unquillo.gov.ar/
 http://www.casadelnino.org.ar
 http://www.enjoy-argentina.org/cordoba-historia-unquillo.php

Populated places in Córdoba Province, Argentina
Cities in Argentina
Argentina
Córdoba Province, Argentina